Nouvilas is a Spanish surname. People with the name include:

 José de Nouvilas de Vilar (1856–1931), Mayor of Ponce, Puerto Rico
 Pilar Nouvilas (1854-1938), Spanish painter
 Ramon Nouvilas, Spanish military figure and Minister of War 

Spanish-language surnames